Valeria Montaldi (born Milan, Italy) is an Italian journalist and writer.

Montaldi earned a degree in History of art criticism. After about twenty years of journalism dedicated to the art, cultural places and people in Milan, in 2001 she published her first novel, The Wool Merchant (Piemme), immediately acclaimed by both public and critics. The book received three prizes: the Premio Ostia Mare in Rome, the Premio Città di Cuneo, and the Premio Frignano. The Wool Merchant was followed in 2003 by The Lord of the Hawk (Piemme), and in 2006 by The English Monk (Rizzoli): both were selected for the Premio Bancarella. The Emperor's Manuscript is her latest novel, scheduled for release in September 2008.

Montaldi's stories take place in the mid-13th century, and move from the castles in Val d'Aosta to the streets of Milan, from the woods of Lombard county to the Mark of Treviso.  She works aristocrats, commoners, monks, heretics, merchants, soldiers, witches, and inquisitors into her narrative.

Montaldi lives and works in Milan.

Bibliography 
The Wool Merchant, Edizioni Piemme (2001)
The Lord of the Hawk, Edizioni Piemme (2003)
The English Monk, Rizzoli (2006)
The Emperor's Manuscript, Rizzoli (2008)

References

External links
Official site

Living people
Journalists from Milan
Italian women writers
Year of birth missing (living people)
Writers from Milan